The Calcare di Aurisina is a Mesozoic geologic formation in Italy. Dinosaurs have been discovered in this formation.

Fauna

Invertebrates

Fish

Crocodiles

Pterosaurs

Dinosaurs

Flora

Plants

Algae

See also 

 List of dinosaur-bearing rock formations
List of stratigraphic units with few dinosaur genera

Footnotes

References
 Weishampel, David B.; Dodson, Peter; and Osmólska, Halszka (eds.): The Dinosauria, 2nd, Berkeley: University of California Press. 861 pp. .

Geologic formations of Italy
Santonian Stage